Tom Hartley (born 1945 or 1946) is a historian and Irish republican politician. Hartley grew up in the Falls Road area of Belfast and became a republican activist in the late 1960s. In 1970, he was imprisoned in the Crumlin Road gaol for ten months for riotous behaviour; he was again imprisoned in 1978. During the 1981 Irish hunger strike, Hartley chaired the POW Committee.

Hartley became active in Sinn Féin, serving as the General Secretary in the mid-1980s and as the Chair in the early 1990s. In 1993, he was elected to Belfast City Council for the Lower Falls, and has held his seat at each subsequent election. Hartley was one of three Sinn Féin candidates in Northern Ireland at the European election in 1994. Although he took only 3.8% of the votes cast and was not elected, he did receive more votes than the party's other candidates.  In 2008, Hartley became the second Sinn Féin Lord Mayor of Belfast. In his spare time, he conducts tours of Belfast City Cemetery and authored the 2006 book Written in Stone: The History of Belfast City Cemetery.

References

1940s births
Living people
Lord Mayors of Belfast
Sinn Féin politicians
Sinn Féin councillors in Northern Ireland